Lì is the pinyin romanization of the Chinese surname written  in Chinese character. It is also spelled Leut according to the Cantonese pronunciation. Relatively uncommon, it is not listed in the Song Dynasty classic Hundred Family Surnames.

Li 栗 is the 249th most common surname in China, with a total population of about 300,000, half of whom live in Henan province.

Origins
According to traditional accounts, the surname Li 栗 originates from the legendary tribe or state called Lilu, and the historical state of Li, which has been linked to Lilu.

In the third-century text Records of Emperors and Kings, Huangfu Mi records the legend that goddess Nüwa enfeoffed thirteen tribes or states, all having the Feng (风) surname. Lilu was ranked the fourth among the thirteen. Professor Li Yujie of Henan University believes that Lilu was likely the first people in China to cultivate chestnuts (the character li 栗 also means chestnut).

During the Shang Dynasty, the state of Li existed in what is now Xiayi County, Shangqiu, Henan province. After the state was conquered by the Zhou Dynasty, its people adopted the name of their former state as their surname. The surname thus has a history of approximately 3,100 years. The Li capital (called Licheng or Li City), now submerged under the Tianlong Lake southwest of the county seat of Xiayi, is a protected site of Shangqiu.

Demographics
With a total population of approximately 300,000, Li is the 249th most common name in China. Henan province has the highest concentration of people with the surname, accounting for half of the total, followed by Hebei, Shanxi, Anhui, and Shaanxi provinces. 80% of all the people with surname live in two provinces: Henan and Hebei.

Notable people
 (栗腹, died 251 BC), Prime Minister of Yan, major state of the Warring States period
, concubine of Emperor Jing of Han, known for her beauty
 and son , high-ranking Qing Dynasty officials
Li Youwen (栗又文; 1901–1984), Governor of Jilin Province
Li Xianting (栗宪庭; born 1949), art critic and curator
Li Zhanshu (栗战书; born 1950), high-ranking official, member of the Politburo of the Chinese Communist Party
Li Zhi (栗智; born 1950), former Communist Party Chief of Ürümqi, Xinjiang
Li Feng (栗峰; died 2003), teacher from Jilin convicted and executed for the rape of his pupils
Li Xin (栗鑫; born 1989), professional football player
Li Peng (栗鹏; born 1990), professional football player

References

Chinese-language surnames
Culture in Henan
Individual Chinese surnames
Chinese-language surnames not found in the Hundred Family Surnames